Kichi-Kemin is a village in the Kemin District of Chüy Region of Kyrgyzstan. Its population was 3,145 in 2021. It is situated on the left bank of the river Kichi-Kemin.

References

Populated places in Chüy Region